Mavilangai/Mavalingai is a small village in Alathur Taluk (old Kunnam), Perambalur District, Tamil Nadu state. It is located 23 km distance from its District main city Perambalur, and 256 km distance from its State Main City Chennai.

Other villages near Mavilangai are Peragambi (4 km), Kannapadi (3 km), Chettikulam (3.5 km), Kurur (3.5 km), Bomanappadi (6 km), Alatur (Taluk-10 km).

Colleges near Mavilangai
Thirumathi Elizabeth Polytechnic College
Roever Engineering College
Christian Teacher Training Institute
Dhanalaxmi, Dhanalaxmi srinivasan (Engineering/Diploma/Arts& Science)
Ramakrishna Plytechnic college
Nehru Memorial College Puthanampatti (Arts & Science) (22 km)
Govt Polytechnic College Perambalur (Veloor)

Schools in Mavilangai

Hindu aided Elementary school
Aathi thiravidar thuvakkapalli

Industries near Mavilangai

MRF tyres company
Chakra Milk Dairy Naranamangalam
Vijay Milk Dairy Peramangalam

Banks nearby Mavilangai

Indian overseas bank, Alathur Gate,
State bank of India, Chettikulam
Union bank of India, Chettikulam
Union bank of India, Padalur
Union bank of India, Melamaiyur
Canara bank, Kulakkanatham

Sports Team in Mavilangai

Cricket: Trouble creators cricket club.

List Of Sub Villages in Mavalingai

Adaikkampatti, Eachampatti, Illuppaikudi, Karaipadi, Alatur Keela Usennagaram Koothanur Kuringipadi Madura Kudikadu Makkaikulam Malayappanagar Mangalam Mangoon Marudhadi Mela Usennagaram Methal Nathakadu Nathakkadu Palambadi Palaya Viralipatti Perumalpalayam Pudhu Viralipatti Pudhuammapalayam Pudukkuruchi Rasulabath S.kudikadu Sadaikanpatti Seeranatham Seetharamapuram Siruganpur East Siruganpur West Thanganagaram Therkumadavi Thiruvalakkuruchi Thondapadi Thotiyapatti Varisaipatti Vijayagopalapuram Zamin Peraiyur

External links
Official Site

Villages in Perambalur district